Mellisson is a townland in the civil parish of Buolick in the barony of Slievardagh in County Tipperary.

At the time of the 1911 census there were fourteen households in the townland.

References

Townlands of County Tipperary